Norfolk and Western Railway Company Historic District is a national historic district located at Roanoke, Virginia.  It encompasses three contributing buildings constructed by the Norfolk and Western Railway.  They are the Neoclassical Revival style General Office Building-South (1896, 1903); the Art Deco period General Office Building-North (1931); and the Moderne style Passenger Station (1905, 1949).  The Passenger Station was renovated by architect Raymond Loewy in 1949.  The Passenger Station is occupied by the O. Winston Link Museum.

It was listed on the National Register of Historic Places in 1999.

References

Norfolk and Western Railway
Historic districts on the National Register of Historic Places in Virginia
Railway stations on the National Register of Historic Places in Virginia
Commercial buildings on the National Register of Historic Places in Virginia
Neoclassical architecture in Virginia
Art Deco architecture in Virginia
Moderne architecture in Virginia
Buildings and structures in Roanoke, Virginia
National Register of Historic Places in Roanoke, Virginia